Referendums in Ukraine, according to the Ukrainian Constitution, are one of the lawful forms of expression of people's will.

Referendums are organized by population initiative of no less than 3 million voters. The referendums are designated by either the Parliament or the President. Any change to the territory of Ukraine can be resolved solely by a national referendum.

Referendum of independence, 1991

On December 1, 1991, a referendum, initiated by parliament of Ukraine, took place. On August 26, 1991, the parliament adopted the Declaration of Independence of Ukraine, and the referendum was called with a question: "Do you support the Declaration of Independence of Ukraine". Of registered voters, 84.18% participated in the referendum, and 90.32% of them answered "Yes".

Referendum of Kuchma, 2000

On April 16, 2000, an All-Ukrainian referendum took place, which was called by the President Kuchma upon population initiative. Four questions were brought up:
 On conditions for dissolution of the parliament
 On immunity of a deputy
 On decrease of the number of parliament deputies
 On introduction of two-chamber parliament
The majority of citizens answered "Yes" on all four questions.
Questions of the referendum  (in Ukrainian)
Results of the referendum  (in Ukrainian)

Referendums on NATO and Common Economic Space
In December 2006, the Central Electoral Committee of Ukraine recognized as valid more than 3 million voters' signatures which were collected in the call for the Referendum on Ukraine joining NATO, and for the Referendum on Ukraine joining Common Economic Space (with Russia, Belarus, and Kazakhstan). The Committee officially informed the President of Ukraine of their decision. It's expected that the President or the Parliament should schedule the referendums. No financing was reserved for the organization of referendums in 2007 State Budget of Ukraine. The signature collection in the call for the referendum was organized by the United Social Democratic Party of Ukraine. .

A Gallup poll conducted in October 2008 showed that 43% of Ukrainians associated NATO as a threat to their country, while only 15% associated it with protection. A November 2009 poll by Ukrainian Project System relieved 40.1% of Ukrainians polled said the Collective Security Treaty Organization (CSTO) was the best global security group for Ukraine to be a part of and 33.9% of the respondents supported Ukraine's full membership in CSTO;  more than 36% of the respondents of the poll said that Ukraine should remain neutral and only 12.5% supported Ukraine's accession to NATO. A 2009 Gallup poll showed that 40% of Ukrainian adults associate NATO with "Threat" and 17% with "Protection". According to a poll by Razumkov Center in March 2011 20.6% on average across Ukraine considered NATO a threat; this number was 51% in Crimea. A 2013 Gallup poll showed that 29% associated NATO with "Threat" and 17% with "Protection"; 44% viewed it as neither.

In February 2014, President Yanukovych fled Ukraine amid the Euromaidan uprising. As a result of this revolution, the interim Yatsenyuk Government came to power in Ukraine. The Yatsenyuk Government initially stated it did not have the intention of making Ukraine a member of NATO. Following parliamentary elections in October 2014, the new government made joining NATO a priority. On 29 December 2014 Ukrainian President Petro Poroshenko (elected president on 25 May 2014) vowed to hold a referendum on joining NATO.

NATO officials vowed support for Ukraine and worked to downplay tensions between the bloc and Russia, which refused to recognize the impeachment of Yanukovych or the Yatsenyuk Government. In late February 2014, Anders Fogh Rasmussen, Secretary General of NATO, reaffirmed that NATO membership is still an option for Ukraine.

Western Ukraine has always been significantly more pro-NATO than the rest of the country; Eastern Ukraine is far more anti-NATO and pro-Russia than the rest of Ukraine. Following the Russian military intervention of 2014, annexation of Crimea and the start of the Donbass War, many Ukrainians changed their views of NATO: polls from the middle of 2014 until 2016 showed that the majority of Ukrainians supported NATO membership.

On 29 August 2015, Baturyn Andrii posted an electronic petition No.22/000052  to the president of Ukraine Petro Poroshenko requesting to run a referendum to join NATO. Petition achieved required 25 000 of votes to be considered. President reply mentions that "One of the main priorities of Ukraine's foreign policy is to deepen cooperation with NATO to achieve the criteria required for membership in this organization. Today we carry out security sector reform in Ukraine to reach NATO standards and to strengthen the country's defense system, which is necessary to counter Russian aggression. Once Ukraine fulfills all the necessary criteria to join the Alliance, final decision on this important issue will be approved by the Ukrainian people in a referendum".

In February 2017, President Poroshenko announced a referendum (given polls that show 54 percent of Ukrainians favor such a move) to be held during his presidency.

2020 referendum 
:ru:Всеукраинский опрос населения (2020)

See also
Elections in Ukraine
Constitution of Ukraine

References

 
Politics of Ukraine
History of Ukraine since 1991